Jojo Tyron Malonzo Perez (September 14, 1984 – December 29, 2011) was a Filipino model, actor and television host and an alumnus of the reality-based talent search StarStruck.

Early life
Perez was born in Brgy. Alfonso, Concepcion, Tarlac, Philippines. He grew up a farmer's son in his hometown, with the rice fields as his playground. He was the youngest among six children.

"He and his father would rise with the sun", said Tyron who quit his Fine Arts studies (freshman at the Bulacan State University) when he joined the GMA star-search StarStruck (first batch, with Mark Herras and Jennylyn Mercado). "There, on top of the carabao, he dreams to be in showbiz. He imagined himself acting with Kris Aquino, his crush and idol. Until he was in high school (at the Benigno Aquino National High School), he and his dad would milk their carabaos early mornings and sell the milk. Sometimes, they would sleep in the middle of the rice fields when we had to water the seedlings (nagpapatubig ng palay)." Before joining StarStruck, Perez first became a member of a late-night variety show of Kuya Germs' Master Showman Presents Walang Tulugan. As part of the said late-night show, he was a member of a teen group performing weekly called MSP Teenstars.

Starstruck Batch 1
Perez joined StarStruck in 2003 but was eliminated in week 6 of the competition.

Personal life
After his manager's death (Douglas Quijano), Perez admitted that his career dwindled and he did not have work for 6 months. In June 2010, Jerry Sineneng led his entry into ABS-CBN and after talks with Malou Santos and Johnny Manahan, Perez had formally signed with the network's talent management arm, Star Magic. This officially made him a Kapamilya. He considered his role Being Gary as one of the biggest he had handled so far, and Momay as his biggest break in television. He also played a role in Bakekang on GMA Network. He married his long-time girlfriend.

Death
Perez was found dead inside a car in Barangay Ugong, Valenzuela City on the night of December 29, 2011. Although initial reports identified suicide as the cause of death, Police Senior Superintendent Atty. Wilben Mayor told ABS-CBN News (Perez's new home network) that "investigations are still ongoing." It was later confirmed that suicide was the cause of Perez's death.
He was buried in Concepcion Japanese Cemetery in Concepcion, Tarlac

Filmography

Film

Note: All his movies are independent films.

Television

References

1985 births
2011 deaths
21st-century Filipino male actors
Filipino male child actors
Filipino male television actors
People from Bulacan
Male actors from Tarlac
Participants in Philippine reality television series
StarStruck (Philippine TV series) participants
GMA Network personalities
ABS-CBN personalities
Star Magic
Suicides by firearm in the Philippines
2011 suicides